Richard Gustafsson Sjöberg (September 20, 1890 – September 14, 1960) was a Swedish athlete who competed in the 1912 Summer Olympics. In 1912 he finished 13th in the high jump competition. In the pole vault event he finished twelfth.

References

External links
 profile

1890 births
1960 deaths
Swedish male high jumpers
Swedish male pole vaulters
Olympic athletes of Sweden
Athletes (track and field) at the 1912 Summer Olympics
20th-century Swedish people